Abdol Majid Majidi (1928–2014) was an Iranian politician who held several cabinet and public posts during the reign of Shah Mohammad Reza Pahlavi. He went into exile following the regime change in Iran in 1979 and settled in Paris.

Early life and education
Majidi was born in Tehran in 1928. His father was a lawyer, and Majidi was the second of his family's seven children.

Majidi was a graduate of the University of Tehran where he received a law degree in 1950. He obtained his PhD in law from the University of Paris and also, attended economy program of the Harvard University's graduate school.

Career
Majidi was a member of the Rastakhiz Party. He held the following posts: deputy prime minister, minister of agricultural products and consumer affairs in the period between 1967 and 1968 and minister of labor and social affairs from 1968 to 1973. He was appointed minister of state and director of the Plan and Budget Organization on 12 January 1973. He replaced Khodadad Mirza Farman Farmaian as director of the Plan and Budget Organization. Majidi remained in both posts until 1977. His successor as director of the Plan and Budget Organization was Mohammad Yeganeh. Majidi served in these posts during the premiership of Amir Abbas Hoveyda. 

Majidi was also the secretary general of the Iranian Red Cross and director of Queen Farah Foundation between 1977 and 1979.

Later years, personal life and death
Majidi was arrested by the martial authorities in January 1979. On 11 February 1979 when the Iranian army announced its neutrality towards the Islamic forces, many prisoners, including Majidi, escaped from the jail. On 26 May 1979 he left Iran after hiding in his relatives' houses and settled in Paris, France, where his wife, Monir Vakili, had been living. They married in 1951, and Monir Vakili was an opera singer and TV personality in Pahlavi Iran. Vakili died in a traffic collision in Belgium on 28 February 1983. They had two daughters.

Majidi died in San Francisco, USA, on 23 February 2014. He was buried in Père Lachaise Cemetery in Paris next to his wife on 28 March 2014.

Work
Majidi published various books, including his memoirs dated 1998.

References

External links

20th-century Iranian politicians
1928 births
2014 deaths
Agriculture ministers of Iran
Burials at Père Lachaise Cemetery
Exiles of the Iranian Revolution in France
Government ministers of Iran
People of Pahlavi Iran
Politicians from Tehran
Rastakhiz Party politicians
University of Tehran alumni
University of Paris alumni